

263001–263100 

|-bgcolor=#f2f2f2
| colspan=4 align=center | 
|}

263101–263200 

|-bgcolor=#f2f2f2
| colspan=4 align=center | 
|}

263201–263300 

|-id=251
| 263251 Pandabear ||  || The giant panda or "panda bear", an endangered species native in south central China || 
|-id=255
| 263255 Jultayu ||  || Jultayu, a 1940-meter mountain in Asturias, northern Spain || 
|}

263301–263400 

|-bgcolor=#f2f2f2
| colspan=4 align=center | 
|}

263401–263500 

|-bgcolor=#f2f2f2
| colspan=4 align=center | 
|}

263501–263600 

|-id=516
| 263516 Alexescu ||  ||  (1929–1993), a Romanian astronomer, director of the Urseanu Observatory in Bucharest and founder of the Planetarium in Bacău || 
|}

263601–263700 

|-id=613
| 263613 Enol ||  || Lake Enol, a mountain lake in the Picos de Europa of northern Spain || 
|}

263701–263800 

|-bgcolor=#f2f2f2
| colspan=4 align=center | 
|}

263801–263900 

|-id=844
| 263844 Johnfarrell ||  || John Farrell (born 1935), an American physicist and an observer of comets and variable stars. He is a member of the Las Cumbres Observatory Global Telescope Network board of directors and Science Advisory Group. || 
|}

263901–264000 

|-id=906
| 263906 Yuanfengfang ||  || Yuan Fengfang (born 1986), founder of the Guangzhou Stargazers Association || 
|-id=932
| 263932 Speyer ||  || Speyer, one of Germany's oldest cities, founded by the ancient Romans || 
|-id=940
| 263940 Malyshkina ||  || Marina Evgen'evna Malyshkina (born 1978), wife of Russian discoverer Timur Valer'evič Krjačko || 
|}

References 

263001-264000